The General Secretariat of the Presidency of the Argentine Nation (SGP) is a secretariat of state of the Argentine National Executive counting with ministerial level, tasked with assisting the President of Argentina in the making of public policy, drafting messages and public speeches, maintaining the presidential protocol and overseeing the relationship between the President and society at large.

The General Secretariat also oversees a number of centralized and decentralized agencies as defined by the Law on Ministries, which may be updated at the President's behest. Since 10 December 2019, the General Secretary of the Presidency has been Julio Vitobello, who serves under President Alberto Fernández.

It is one of (currently) four secretariats in the Argentine government counting with ministerial level, the other being the Legal and Technical Secretariat, the Secretariat of Strategic Affairs and the Secretariat of Communications and Press.

Attributions and organization
The 1983 Law on Ministries, decreed by Raúl Alfonsín, established eight secretariats reporting directly to the Office of the President tasked to delegate some of the President's direct responsibilities whilst aiding the head of state in the elaboration of public policies, among other responsibilities. These included, alongside the General Secretariat of the Presidency, the Legal and Technical Secretariat, the Planning Secretariat, the Intelligence Secretariat (SIDE, later disestablished and reformed into the AFI), the Media Secretariat, the Public Affairs Secretariat, the Science and Technology Secretariat, the Secretariat of Comprehensive Policies on Drugs (SEDRONAR) and the Habitat Secretariat.

Since 2001, the General Secretariat of the Presidency counts with ministerial rank, and as such, the General Secretary may issue ministerial decrees.

Headquarters
The General Secretariat is entirely headquartered in the Casa Rosada, the official working residence of the President of Argentina. In addition, the General Secretary also counts with responsibilities and jurisdiction over the Quinta de Olivos.

List of secretaries

References

External links
 Official website (in Spanish)

Government agencies of Argentina
Government agencies established in 1983
Presidency of Raúl Alfonsín